Rieser–Shoemaker Farm is a historic farm complex and national historic district located in Bern Township, Berks County, Pennsylvania.  It has seven contributing 'buildings' and two contributing 'structures'.  They are a 2 1/2-story, vernacular Federal brick farmhouse (c. 1820); stone Pennsylvania bank barn (c. 1820); a group of stone, brick, and frame outbuildings (c. 1820-1930); and a stone walled spring.  The original land grant to Henry Reiser was in 1725.  The farm is 'located' approximately 1/4-mile from the Rieser Mill.

It was listed on the National Register of Historic Places in 1992.

Gallery

References

Farms on the National Register of Historic Places in Pennsylvania
Historic districts on the National Register of Historic Places in Pennsylvania
Federal architecture in Pennsylvania
Houses completed in 1820
Houses in Berks County, Pennsylvania
National Register of Historic Places in Berks County, Pennsylvania